Pudhalvan is a 1997 Tamil-language crime film directed by Selva Vinayagam, who had previously directed the films Kottai Vaasal (1992) and Aranmanai Kaavalan (1994). The film stars Ramki and Pragathi, with Vijayakumar, Jayanthi, newcomer Raghavi, Mohan Natarajan, S. N. Vasanth and Raja Raveendar playing supporting roles. It was released on 26 December 1997. The film was a remake of Telugu film Doshi Nirdoshi (1990).

Plot

Siva (Ramki) is an honest police inspector who was brought up by the judge Sathyamoorthy (Vijayakumar) when his mother died. Sathyamoorthy has two sons: Ramesh (S. N. Vasanth) and Raja (Raja Raveendar). The influential smuggler Mudaliar (Mohan Natarajan) often clashes with Siva and Sathyamoorthy. Siva and the jolly college student Priya (Pragathi) fall in love with each other, later they get married with Sathyamoorthy's blessing.

One day, Raja rapes Mudaliar's daughter. The next day, Raja is found dead and Siva conducts the investigation. Ramesh admits to his father that he killed Raja. Sathyamoorthy decides to protect Ramesh at all costs, while Siva wants to send Ramesh to jail. What transpires later forms the crux of the story.

Cast

Ramki as Inspector Siva
Pragathi as Priya
Vijayakumar as Sathyamoorthy
Jayanthi as Parvathi
Rani
Meesai Murugesan
Pandu
Halwa Vasu
Mohan Natarajan as Mudaliar
S. N. Vasanth as Ramesh
Raja Raveendar as Raja
Soundar as Soundar
Thideer Kannaiah
Raghavi
Manager Cheena
Vincent Roy
Anuja
M. G. Raja Gopal
R. K.
Musthafa
Mukilan

Soundtrack

The film score and the soundtrack were composed by Deva. The soundtrack, released in 1997, features 5 tracks with lyrics written by Vairamuthu.

References

1997 films
1990s Tamil-language films
Films scored by Deva (composer)
Fictional portrayals of the Tamil Nadu Police
Indian action drama films
Tamil remakes of Telugu films
1990s action drama films